Hayton and Mealo is a civil parish in Allerdale district, Cumbria. The only settlement is Hayton, a village in the centre of the parish, which had a population of 237 in the 2011 census.  In 1848, its population was 378.

The western boundary of the parish is a short stretch of coastline south of Allonby; working clockwise it is then bordered by Allonby parish to the north, Westnewton to the north east, Aspatria to the east and Oughterside and Allerby to the south. The B5300 road runs along the western edge of the parish, on the coast, and the A596 road from Aspatria to Maryport runs just outside the parish's south eastern boundary.

There is a parish council, forming the lowest level of local government. Its archives 1997-2013 are held at the Carlisle Archive Centre.

The Manor of Hayton was long held by the Musgrave family, from about 1500 until the early 19th century, when it passed to the Hylton and Jolliffe family through marriage.

Listed buildings

There are seven listed buildings in the parish, including the grade 1 listed Hayton Castle.

References

External links

Civil parishes in Cumbria
Allerdale